Mayo Thompson (born February 26, 1944 in Houston, Texas, United States) is an American musician and visual artist best known as the leader of the experimental rock band Red Krayola.

Background

His formal education includes Garden of Arts Kindergarten until Holy Rosary Elementary School through fifth grade, then Moye Military School until high school at Cascia Hall College Preparatory School, from which he received a diploma in 1962. He went on to study at St. Thomas University, trying variously, off and on, in some cases simultaneously, pre-Law, Creative Writing, English and American Literature, Philosophy, and Art History, before dropping out and starting The Red Crayola with Frederick Barthelme in 1966.

In college, Thompson began to find an affinity for jazz, "I learnt an awful lot from jazz".

He states in the Red Krayola 1994 live documentary of their Japanese tour, "I was more interested in composing new material than interpreting old material".

1950s

In 1955, Mayo Thompson started taking piano lessons at the age of 11.

In 1958, Mayo Thompson started a short-lived band with a friend he met in boarding school.

1960s

On November 15th 1964, Thompson performed a cover of Baby, Please Don't Go at the University of St. Thomas (Texas). 

In 1966, amid the burgeoning Houston psychedelic scene, Thompson formed the band the Red Crayola with fellow art students Frederick Barthelme (brother of novelist Donald Barthelme) and Steve Cunningham, they gathered a travelling entourage of hgangers-on who improvised with them on stage and in the studio, they were known as the Familiar Ugly. Their intended second album, Coconut Hotel was rejected by their record company for being too abstract and experimental.

1970s
In the early 1970s, he lived in New York City, where he worked as a studio assistant for Robert Rauschenberg. 

In 1970, Thompson released his only solo album to date, titled Corky's Debt To His Father, on the Texas Revolution label. The album consists instead of ten lyrically dense but warm-hearted pop songs, in various styles – Dylan-inspired blues-rock, Tex-Mex pop-rock with psychedelic touches, and early country rock not dissimilar to the contemporary work of Gram Parsons and the Flying Burrito Brothers. Thompson was backed by studio musicians on the album and none of his usual Krayola cohorts appear. It was recorded in Houston. It was re-released by the Glass label in 1985 and  Drag City in 2008.

After becoming disillusioned with the American art scene, he moved to London having joined the conceptual art group Art & Language, with whom he went on to record six albums: Corrected Slogans (1976), Kangaroo? (1981), Black Snakes (1983), Sighs Trapped by Liars (2007), Five American Portraits (2010). Another album, Baby and Child Care, was recorded shortly after Black Snakes in 1984 with most of the same personnel, but not released until 2016. 

While in London, he became involved with Geoff Travis's distribution business at Rough Trade Records. When the label decided to begin releasing records in 1978, Thompson was asked to assist in producing them because Travis did not feel that he had enough experience in the studio. Thompson is credited as producer on early records by The Fall, Stiff Little Fingers, The Raincoats, Cabaret Voltaire, Kleenex and many other seminal groups. 

Working at Rough Trade also led him to reform the Red Crayola with new members from the bands he was working with. The resulting line-up (1979–1983) included a number of important post-punk musicians: Gina Birch of The Raincoats, Lora Logic of X-Ray Spex and Essential Logic, Epic Soundtracks of the Swell Maps, and Allen Ravenstine of Pere Ubu. All members of Pere Ubu, aside from drummer Scott Krauss, contributed to the Soldier Talk album. The band continued its association with Art & Language, who often contributed lyrics to songs such as A Portrait of V.I. Lenin in the Style of Jackson Pollock which references their well-known painting. The song Born in Flames was written for the soundtrack of Lizzie Borden's 1983 radical feminist film of the same name.

1980s
In the early 1980s, he was a member of Pere Ubu, performing on their albums The Art of Walking and Song of the Bailing Man. He also appears on seven of thirteen tracks on the Pere Ubu live album, One Man Drives While the Other Man Screams, and plays accordion on the David Thomas and the Pedestrians album The Sound of the Sand. In 1980 he produced Grotesque (After The Gramme) by The Fall. In 1982 he started to compose the musical score of Victorine, the opera written by Art & Language for the Documenta 7. In 1983 he recorded a series of monologues and vocal tracks for a collaborative effort with German musicians Dieter Moebius and Conny Plank.  The recordings were shelved for 15 years but were finally released as Ludwig's Law in 1998. While living in Germany in 1987, he began collaborating with the German painter Albert Oehlen, first on a soundtrack for the film The Last of England by Derek Jarman. The two would later reform the Red Crayola again with an entirely new line-up.

Thompson produced the 1986 self-titled debut by the Shop Assistants for the Blue Guitar label. Thompson was also, alongside Geoff Travis, director of the label. He also produced another debut album, "Brave Words" by The Chills, released in 1987.

1990s-present
In the early 1990s, Thompson met the avant-garde guitarist David Grubbs who offered him a chance to release new music with Red Crayola on Drag City in Chicago. Thompson accepted and the Red Crayola roster ballooned again, this time encompassing many of the important post-rock musicians of the time, including members of Gastr del Sol and Tortoise. The group has continued in a more or less similar configuration since 1994.

In 1994, he accepted a teaching position at the Art Center College of Design in Pasadena. In 2008 the association ended. 

Since 2009 he has lived with his wife and their dog in California.

Discography

Studio albums
 Corky's Debt To His Father (1970)
With Pere Ubu
 The Art of Walking (1980)
 Song of the Bailing Man (1982)
With Moebius & Conny Plank 
 Ludwig's Law (1998)
With Sven-Åke Johansson Quintett
 Shotgun Wedding (2005)

Produced
 God Bless the Red Krayola and All Who Sail With It by Red Krayola (1968)

 He's Frank / Alphaville by The Monochrome Set (1979)

 Inflammable Material by Stiff Little Fingers (1979)

 Fairytale in the Supermarket / In Love / Adventures Close to Home by The Raincoats (1979)

 You / Ü by Kleenex/LiLiPUT (1979)

 Gotta Gettaway / Bloody Sunday by Stiff Little Fingers (1979)

 Nag Nag Nag /  Is That Me (Finding Someone at the Door Again?) by Cabaret Voltaire (1979)

 The Raincoats by The Raincoats (1979)

 Fiery Jack by the Fall (1980)

 Grotesque (After the Gramme) by the Fall (1980)

 Are You Glad To Be In America? by James Blood Ulmer (1980)

 Eligible Bachelors by The Monochrome Set (1982)

 Brave Words by The Chills (1987)

 Poem Of The River by Felt (1987)

 Sonic Flower Groove by Primal Scream (1987)

 Manhattan Beach by Overpass (1994)

 Japan in Paris in L.A. by Red Krayola (2004)

Covers

Pere Ubu the band Mayo Thompson later joined, covered Horses from Corky's Debt To His Father for their 1980 album The Art of Walking.

Lower Dens covered "Dear Betty Baby" in 2011.

References

External links
 Mayo Thompson at Galerie Buchholz
 Mayo Thompson and The Red Crayola Discography
 Mayo Thompson by Keith Connolly Bomb

1944 births
American male singers
Art & Language
Songwriters from Texas
Protopunk musicians
Living people
People from Houston
University of St. Thomas (Texas) alumni
Drag City (record label) artists
Pere Ubu members
Glass Records artists
Red Krayola members